Dixon Flores (born 2 July 1994 in Juigalpa, Chontales) is a Nicaraguan professional boxer who challenged for the WBC super flyweight title in 2015.

Professional boxing record

References

1994 births
Living people
Nicaraguan male boxers
People from Chontales Department
Super-flyweight boxers
Bantamweight boxers